President Masaryk was a river monitor of the First Czechoslovak Republic, serving from 1932 until the dissolution of the republic in 1939. With four  guns in two twin turrets, it was that nation's most powerful warship of the 1930s and flagship of the Czechoslovakian river flotilla. After the German occupation, the ship was taken into the German army under the name Bechelaren and fought against the Soviets. It was scrapped in 1978.

Service in Czechoslovakia
In the 1920s, the Czechoslovakian naval forces operated river craft inherited from the Austro-Hungarian Empire. These being obsolescent, in the late 1920s plans were made to build two new large river patrol craft. Only one of these, President Masaryk, was built.

The design of President Masaryk was based on the Austrian monitor Catfish. It was designed at the Škoda Works and built at the Škoda shipyard in Komárno. The flat-bottomed hull was divided into 15 watertight compartments.

Various Czechoslovakian (and other) companies contributed components to the vessel: Poldi Kladno supplied steel plates, the Škoda works at Plzeň the engines, and the Hamburg company Zeis the marine propellers. Yarrow boilers were installed on the vessel. The ship was laid down in August 1929 and launched in 1930 or 1931. Trials showed that the ship did not perform to specifications, so it was returned to the shipyard for major modifications. Among other changes, the single stack was replaced with dual stacks, one for each engine. After this it patrolled the Danube River from its base in Bratislava for the rest of the First Czechoslovak Republic's existence. President Masaryk was the only Czechoslovakian ship able to match the best ships of the other Danubian powers (Yugoslavia, Romania, and Hungary) in the 1930s.

Career in German service
After the German invasion of 1939, the ship was used by the Germans. Until 1941 it was based in Linz and continued to patrol the Danube. In 1941 it was transferred downriver to the area of Yugoslavia (which had been overrun by the Germans).

In 1943 the vessel was returned to Linz and underwent extensive modernization. The stacks were removed and replaced with exhaust pipes on the sides of the vessel. The single rudder was replaced with two. Using space freed up by the changes in propulsion machinery, a quadruple mount with four 20 mm flak guns was installed. A separate 20 mm cannon on the stern was replaced with a 37 mm flak gun, and the machine gun turret at the front was removed.

In 1944 Bechelaren was returned to duty on the lower Danube. On the night of April 5–6, 1944, while escorting a convoy, the vessel was damaged by planes of the Red Air Force. After repairs, it was returned to service at Visegrád, Hungary. Later it returned to Linz, where (since 66 mm ammunition was no longer being manufactured) its four  guns were replaced with two  naval guns with light shields.

Bechelaren then participated in combat operations in Yugoslavia and Hungary. In 1944 it supported the German counterattack toward Budapest and at Melk in Austria it fought Soviet gunboats. This was Bechelarens last combat mission.

Final years
On May 11, 1945, Bechelarens crew surrendered the ship to the United States Army in Linz. In 1947 the ship was returned (without weapons) to Czechoslovakia and taken to Bratislava, where in 1951 it was restored to working condition, but was never re-armed. The Czechoslovakian Army having no further use for the vessel, it was sold to the civilian sector in 1955. The hull then served as a hulk for storage and workshops at the Komárno Shipyard. In 1978 President Masaryk was scrapped.

References

Further reading
  
 

Naval ships of Czechoslovakia
Ships built in Czechoslovakia
1932 ships
World War II monitors
Riverine warfare
World War II naval ships of Germany
Naval ships captured by Germany during World War II